Hiawassee High School, also known as Hiawassee Academy, was a Baptist affiliated high school in Hiawassee, Georgia. It was co-ed and A.B. Greene was the principal from at least 1897 until 1909. It eventually became Hiawasee Junior College.

History
The school was established not long after Young Harris College opened in 1886. In 1921 enrollment was reported to be 127.

History
The school opened in the Towns County Courthouse in 1887.
It was a day school and boarding school maintained by the Home Mission Board of the Southern Baptist Convention.

Preacher George W. Truett was a founder (with his cousin and fellow preacher Fred McConnell), principal, and taught at the school before being recruited to move tp Texas after speaking at a conference.

The school featured on a photo postcard.

The school band is included in a story in The Greats of Cuttercane playing as part of the festivities celebrating the debut of The Lone Biker and a visit by its star to Hiawassee as part of The Story of Felton Eugene Walker.

Alumni
Homer Sutton (Hiawassee Junior College)
Calvin Paris Wilbanks

See also
Towns County High School, the county's public high school
Young Harris Institute, competing Methodist preparatory school that became Young Harris College

References

Defunct private schools in the United States
1887 establishments in Georgia (U.S. state)
Defunct Christian schools in the United States
Defunct schools in Georgia (U.S. state)
Baptist schools in the United States
Educational institutions established in 1887